The Lisitsa, also known as Bolshaya Lisitsa, is a river in Tomsk Oblast in Russia, a right tributary of the Ket (Ob basin). The Lisitsa flows over the West Siberian Plain. Its biggest tributary is the Rayga.

References

Rivers of Tomsk Oblast